The 1450 class was a class of diesel locomotive built by Clyde Engineering, Granville for Queensland Railways in 1957-1958.

History
The 1450 class was an evolution of the 1400 class, being built as a Co-Co instead of an A1A-A1A. This increased the weight by  but improved the tractive effort. They mainly operated in South East Queensland. To accommodate the Co-Co bogies, the unit was lengthened on both ends. The Sarmiento Railway in Argentina operated similarly-lengthened G12s, officially designated the GR12. The South American units differed from the Australian ones in having only the No. 1 end hood lengthened. The first was withdrawn in December 1986.
Three have been preserved by Queensland Rail's Heritage Division, and are stored at Workshops Rail Museum, North Ipswich:

Status table

References

Clyde Engineering locomotives
Co-Co locomotives
Diesel locomotives of Queensland
Queensland Rail locomotives
Railway locomotives introduced in 1957
Diesel-electric locomotives of Australia
3 ft 6 in gauge locomotives of Australia